The Undivided EP is the first extended play by Asian girl group Blush. It was released digitally on May 10, 2012 under FarWest Entertainment.

Charting
Three songs from the EP have charted in the Billboard Dance Chart: "Undivided" (#3), "Dance On" (#1) and "All Stars" (#14)

Track listing

References

2012 albums